Innovation, Science and Economic Development Canada (ISED;) is a department of the Government of Canada. ISED is responsible for a number of the federal government's functions in regulating industry and commerce, promoting science and innovation, and supporting economic development. The department was known as Industry Canada (IC) prior to 2015.

The department is led by the minister of innovation, science and industry (currently François-Philippe Champagne), who also serves as the registrar general of Canada and is responsible for the department to Parliament. Several other ministerial portfolios are associated with the department. While the minister is head of the department, and provides policy/political direction, the day-to-day operations of the department are managed by the deputy minister, who is a public servant. The department headquarters are located at the C.D. Howe Building at 235 Queen Street in Ottawa, Ontario.

History

The Department of Trade and Commerce was created in statute on 23 June 1887 and proclaimed into force on 3 December 1892. In 1969, the department was replaced by the Department of Industry, Trade and Commerce, which itself was replaced in 1990 by Industry, Science and Technology. This new department also absorbed the offices of Minister of Regional Industrial Expansion and Minister of State for Science and Technology, marking the inclusion of regional approaches and scientific emphasis in the development of Canadian industries. In 1993, the department expanded its portfolio further to include Consumer and Corporate Affairs. In March 1995, the department was renamed Industry Canada.

Upon the November 2015 installation of the 29th Canadian Ministry led by Prime Minister Justin Trudeau, the position Minister of Industry was renamed Minister of Innovation, Science, and Economic Development. Subsequently, applied title under the Federal Identity Program was changed from Industry Canada to Innovation, Science and Economic Development Canada.

Officials and structure
The department at large is headed by the minister of innovation, science and industry, François-Philippe Champagne. 

Three portfolios of ISED are designated to other ministers, however:

 Minister of International Trade, Export Promotion, Small Business and Economic Development (Mary Ng)
 Minister of Tourism (Randy Boissonnault)
 Minister of Rural Economic Development (Gudie Hutchings)

Portfolio
ISED oversees 17 departments and agencies and is associated with an additional 4 organizations. Each of these organizations are related to one or more of the four focus areas of ISED: innovation in science and technology, trade and investment, growing small and medium-sized enterprises, and economic growth of Canadian communities.

Measurement Canada and the Canadian Intellectual Property Office are special operating agencies of ISED. Communications Research Centre Canada is a research institute that provides technical advice and support to ISED's Spectrum and Telecommunications Sector,

In addition to Innovation, Science and Economic Development Canada, the ministerial portfolio includes:

 Atlantic Canada Opportunities Agency
 Business Development Bank of Canada
 Canada Economic Development for Quebec Regions (CED)
Canadian Northern Economic Development Agency
 Canadian Space Agency
 Competition Tribunal
Copyright Board of Canada
 Destination Canada (formerly the Canadian Tourism Commission)
 Federal Economic Development Initiative for Northern Ontario
 Federal Economic Development Agency for Southern Ontario
 National Research Council Canada (NRC)
 Natural Sciences and Engineering Research Council (NSERC)
 Social Sciences and Humanities Research Council  (SSHRC)
 Standards Council of Canada 
 Statistics Canada
 Western Economic Diversification Canada

ISED is associated with the following organizations:

 Canada Foundation for Innovation 
 Council of Canadian Academies 
 Genome Canada 
 Pierre Elliott Trudeau Foundation
 Sustainable Development Technology Canada

Related legislation

The departmental legislation for ISED is the Department of Industry Act, which states that the minister's objective is to use their role in order to "strengthen the national economy and promote sustainable development." The Act also outlines a number of supporting objectives. The minister must also use their position to support domestic trade and support a healthy marketplace through investment and technology.

, ISED is responsible for various legislation, especially those related to economic development, including:

 Departmental legislation:
 Department of Industry Act, S.C. 1995, c. 1
 Telecommunications legislation:
 Radiocommunication Act, R.S.C. 1985, c. R-2
 Telecommunications Act, S.C. 1993, c. 38
 Marketplace and trade legislation:
 Agreement on Internal Trade Implementation Act, S.C. 1996, c. 17
 Bankruptcy and Insolvency Act, R.S.C. 1985, c. B-3
 Boards of Trade Act, R.S.C. 1985, c. B-6
 Canada Business Corporations Act, R.S.C. 1985, c. C-44
 Canada Cooperatives Act, S.C. 1998, c. 1
 Canada Corporations Act, R.S.C. 1970, c. C-32
 Canada Not-for-profit Corporations Act, S.C. 2009, c. 23
 Canada Small Business Financing Act, S.C. 1998, c. 36
 Companies' Creditors Arrangement Act, R.S.C. 1985, c. C-36
 Competition Act, R.S.C. 1985, c. C-34
 Government Corporations Operation Act, R.S.C. 1985, c. G-4
 Investment Canada Act, R.S.C. 1985, c. 28 (1st Supp.) (except Parts II–V1, but not Part IV.1)
 Winding-up and Restructuring Act, R.S.C. 1985, c. W-11 (Part I)

 Intellectual property legislation:
 Copyright Act, R.S.C. 1985, c. C-42
 Industrial Design Act, R.S.C. 1985, c. I-9
 Integrated Circuit Topography Act, S.C.  1990, c. 37
 Olympic and Paralympic Marks Act, S.C. 2007, c. 25
 Patent Act, R.S.C. 1985, c. P-4 (except sections 79–103)
 Public Servants Inventions Act, R.S.C. 1985, c. P-32
 Trade-marks Act, R.S.C. 1985, c. T-13

 Consumer legislation:
 Bills of Exchange Act, R.S.C. 1985, c. B-4 (Part V)
 Consumer Packaging and Labelling Act, R.S.C. 1985, c. C-38 (except in relation to food)
 Electricity and Gas Inspection Act, R.S.C. 1985, c. E-4
 Personal Information Protection and Electronic Documents Act, S.C.  2000, c-5
 Precious Metals Marking Act, R.S.C. 1985, c. P-19
 Textile Labelling Act, R.S.C. 1985, c. T-10
 Timber Marking Act, R.S.C. 1985, c. T-11
 Weights and Measures Act, R.S.C. 1985, c. W-6

 Registrar General functions
 Public Documents Act, R.S.C. 1985, c. P-28
 Public Officers Act, R.S.C. 1985, c. P-31
 Seals Act, R.S.C. 1985, c. S-6
 Trade Unions Act, R.S.C. 1985, c. T-14

 Portfolio and agency legislation:
 Business Development Bank of Canada Act, S.C. 1995, c. 28
 Budget Implementation Act, 1997, S.C.  1997, c. 26 (Part I: Canada Foundation for Innovation)
 Canadian Space Agency Act, S.C. 1990, c. 13
 Canadian Tourism Commission Act, S.C. 2000, c. 28
 Civil International Space Station Agreement Implementation Act, S.C. 1999, c. 35
 Competition Tribunal Act, R.S.C. 1985, c. 19 (2nd Supp.)
 National Research Council Act, R.S.C. 1985, c. N-15
 Natural Sciences and Engineering Research Council Act, R.S.C. 1985, c. N-21
 Social Sciences and Humanities Research Council Act, R.S.C. 1985, c. S-12
 Standards Council of Canada Act, R.S.C. 1985, c. S-16
 Statistics Act, R.S.C. 1985, c. S-19

 Other legislation:
 Agricultural and Rural Development Act, R.S.C. 1985, c. A-3
 Atlantic Canada Opportunities Agency Act, R.S.C. 1985, c. 41 (4th Supp.)
 Atlantic Fisheries Restructuring Act, R.S.C. 1985, c. A-14 (in respect of certain companies)
 Bell Canada Act, S.C.  1987, c. 19
 Corporations Returns Act, R.S.C. 1985, c. C-43
 Employment Support Act, S.C.  1970-71-72, c. 56
 Industrial and Regional Development Act, R.S.C. 1985, c. I-8 (except in relation to certain provinces)
 Pension Fund Societies Act, R.S.C. 1985, c. P-8
 Regional Development Incentives Act, R.S.C. 1970, c. R-38)
 Small Business Investment Grants Act, S.C.  1980-81-82-83, c. 147
 Special Areas Act, R.S.C. 1985, c. S-14 (Ontario)

Certifications and approvals 
 Technical Acceptance Certificate (TAC) for Category I radio and broadcasting equipment.

See also
 List of telecommunications regulatory bodies

References

Notes

External links

 Federal Economic Development Agency for Southern Ontario
 Pierre Elliot Trudeau Foundation 
 Science, Technology and Innovation Council

 
Federal departments and agencies of Canada
Canada
Canada
Ministries established in 1993
1993 establishments in Canada